Oscar Noronha Filho (January 9, 1916 – April 2015) was a Brazilian lawyer, military and politician. He was the Federal Deputy who replaced Leonel Brizola during the first years of the Militar Dictatorship in Brazil.

Biography 
During the World War II, he fought in the Brazilian Expedicionary Force (FAB).

In the 1962 Legislative Elections, was unsuccessfully candidate for Federal Deputy for Guanabara. However, due to the 1964 Coup d'état, he took office on April 13, 1964, replacing Leonel Brizola (PTB).

In 1999, Noronha Filho became the president of the National Mobilization Party (PMN) after the exit of Celso Brant (AVANTE).

References 

1916 births
2015 deaths
People from Caxambu
20th-century Brazilian lawyers
Party of National Mobilization politicians
Brazilian Labour Party (current) politicians
Brazilian Democratic Movement politicians
Brazilian Labour Party (historical) politicians
Brazilian military personnel of World War II